Still Point may refer to:

The Still Point (film), a 1986 Australian film
The Still Point a 2010 novel by British author Amy Sackville
Still Point Zen Buddhist Temple in Detroit, Michigan
The Still Point: A Beginner's Guide to Zen Meditation, a book by Zen Buddhist author John Daido Loori
 Still Point (Amber Asylum album), a 2007 album by American experimental band Amber Asylum
Stillpoint, a 1973 album by Australian progressive rock band Madder Lake